Virbhadra Singh (23 June 19348 July 2021) was an Indian politician who served 6 terms and 21 years as the 4th Chief Minister of Himachal Pradesh. A leader of the Indian National Congress party, he was elected 9 times as a Member of Legislative Assembly to the Himachal Pradesh Vidhan Sabha and 5 times as Member of Parliament to the Lok Sabha. Virbhadra Singh was popularly known by the honorific Raja Sahib. Singh holds the distinction of being the longest serving Chief Minister of Himachal Pradesh, holding the office from 1983 to 1990, from 1993 to 1998, from 2003 to 2007 and finally from 2012 to 2017, when he was succeeded by the BJP's Jai Ram Thakur. He was elected to the Lok Sabha in 1962, 1967, 1971, 1980 and 2009. Singh served as a Union Minister in the governments of Indira Gandhi and Manmohan Singh. At the time of his demise, he was serving as an MLA from Arki constituency.

Personal life
Virbhadra Singh was born on 23 June 1934 at Sarahan, Shimla district in the royal Rajput family of the erstwhile princely state of Bushahr. He was the 122nd titular Raja of Bushahr from 1947 until 1971, when, by the 26th Amendment to the Constitution of India,  the privy purses of the princes were abolished and official recognition of their titles came to an end.

Singh was educated at Colonel Brown Cambridge School, Dehradun, St. Edward's School, Shimla and Bishop Cotton School, Shimla and later obtained a BA Honours degree from St. Stephen's College, Delhi.

He was married to Ratna Kumari, princess of Jubbal in May 1954. They had four daughters including Abhilasha Kumari, a former judge who served on the High Court of Gujarat from 2006 to 2018. Ratna Kumari died in 1983 after prolonged sickness.

In 1985, he was married for the second time, to Pratibha Singh, princess of Keonthal. Pratibha is currently elected to the Lok Sabha from Mandi. She had been elected thrice to the Lok Sabha from Mandi, currently after 2021 bypoll and previously for the first time in 2004 and later in bypoll in 2013. They both had a daughter and a son. His daughter Aparajitha Singh is married to the Maharaja of Patiala and former Punjab Chief Minister Capt. Amarinder Singh's grandson. His son Vikramaditya Singh is currently serving as Member of Legislative Assembly from Shimla Rural constituency.

National politics
Singh gained a seat in the Lok Sabha—which is the lower house of the Parliament of India—in the Indian general elections of 1962. He repeated that success in the elections of 1967 and 1971. He was again elected to the Lok Sabha in 1980 and a further election to that house came in 2009, following an absence from the intervening two Lok Sabhas. His wife had served a term following her victory in the 2004 elections.

He was a member of the Indian Delegation to the General Assembly of the United Nations in 1976.

Between 1976 and 1977, Singh held the national office of Deputy Minister for Tourism and Civil Aviation in central cabinet. He was Minister of State for Industries between 1980 and 1983. From May 2009 until January 2011, he held the cabinet post of Minister for Steel. He then became cabinet minister with responsibility for Ministry of Micro, Small and Medium Enterprises, until resigning from office in June 2012.

State politics
Aside from his role in national politics, Singh had also been elected on seven occasions to the Himachal Pradesh Legislative Assembly. The first occasion was in a by-election in October 1983, when he was returned for the Jubbal-Kotkhai constituency. He won that seat again in the 1985 elections. Thereafter, he was elected from the Rohru constituency in 1990, 1993, 1998, 2003 and 2007 and in 2012 from Shimla rural assembly constituency.
 

Singh became the Chief Minister of Himachal Pradesh for the first time in April 1983 and held the post until March 1990. He was again appointed to the role between December 1993 and March 1998; and once more from March 2003. With reappointments within those years, this record amounted to him holding the office on five occasions.

Between 1998 and 2003, Singh was Leader of the Opposition in the state Assembly.  He was president of the Himachal Pradesh Congress Committee in 1977, 1979 and 1980 and from 26 August 2012 to December 2012. In July 2012, he quit all key party posts at a crucial time prior to the state elections of November 2012. It has been reported that the trigger for the resignations was his exclusion from the Screening Committee for short-listing of election candidates.

Singh was appointed to lead the party on the eve of the November 2012 elections and did so with success. The party then agreed to him becoming Chief Minister of Himachal Pradesh for a record sixth time. His party lost majority in the 2017 elections and he tendered his resignation afterwards.

Social and cultural activities
Outside of politics, Singh had an involvement with various social and cultural bodies. A consequence of these interests is that he was president of the Sanskrit Sahitya Sammelan and of the Himachal Pradesh branch of the Friends of the Soviet Union.

Corruption charges
On 3 August 2009, a legal case was registered against Singh and his wife by the Anti-Corruption Bureau of Himachal Pradesh. The allegations were that they had breached the Prevention of Corruption Act in 1989, when Singh was Chief Minister of the state. The Bureau alleged that it had evidence in recorded conversations between the couple and various others concerning suspect financial transactions. The alleged recordings, which involved a now-dead officer of the Indian Administrative Service and several industrialists, dated from 2007 and were provided by a political opponent, Vijai Singh Mankotia.

The couple were granted bail in December 2010, but in April 2011, the state government requested that this be rescinded due to allegations of witness tampering. This request followed attempts by two industrialists to remove themselves from the prosecution case, claiming that the evidence was forged and incorrect.

The Singhs have attempted to have the matter taken out of police hands and passed to the Central Bureau of Investigation, as well as seeking a stay on further trial court proceedings. In January 2012, the Himachal Pradesh High Court had refused the latest of their petitions aimed at achieving the transfer and stay. The court ordered that the examination of potential charges and evidence by a trial court should go ahead. On 26 June 2012, Singh resigned from the Union Cabinet as a consequence of corruption charges being pressed against him. The couple were acquitted on the eve of Singh taking the role of Chief Minister in December 2012.

CBI inquiry
In 2015 the Central Bureau of Investigation filed a case against Singh and his family for owning assets to the tune of Rs. 6.1 crore disproportionate to his known sources of income when he was the union minister between 2009 and 2011. Cases have been filed against his wife Pratibha Singh, son Vikramaditya and daughter Aparajita as well. On Saturday, 26 September, the Central Bureau of Investigations (CBI) raided 11 properties of Virbhadra Singh to probe the charges of accumulating disproportionate assets. A case had been filed by the agency one day before the raids. On 26 October 2015, the Indian Supreme Court turned down a CBI plea seeking stay against an earlier order issued by the Himachal Pradesh High Court granting protection from arrest and other relief to him and his wife in a disproportionate assets case. The SC, however, issued a notice to Singh and his wife, seeking response from Singh on the two petitions filed by the CBI.

Death
Singh's health deteriorated after he suffered from a cardiac arrest on 5 July 2021 in Indira Gandhi Medical College, Shimla. He had tested positive for COVID-19 on 11 June for the second time in two months. Virbhadra Singh died on 8 July 2021 due to multiple organ failure. The Himachal Pradesh government observed a three-day state mourning as a mark of respect to him. Virbhadra Singh was cremated with full state honours in Shimla's Rampur Bushahr on 10 July 2021.

Gallery

References

External links

 Raja Virbhadra Singh: The Untold Story - Girish Suri
 

|-

|-

|-

|-

1934 births
2021 deaths
India MPs 1962–1967
India MPs 1967–1970
India MPs 1971–1977
India MPs 1980–1984
India MPs 2009–2014
Chief ministers from Indian National Congress
Chief Ministers of Himachal Pradesh
Deaths from the COVID-19 pandemic in India
Himachal Pradesh MLAs 2007–2012
Himachal Pradesh MLAs 2012–2017
Himachal Pradesh MLAs 2017–2022
Indian National Congress politicians
Lok Sabha members from Himachal Pradesh
Members of the Cabinet of India
People from Shimla district
St. Stephen's College, Delhi alumni
Steel Ministers of India
Indian National Congress politicians from Himachal Pradesh
Bishop Cotton School Shimla alumni